David S. Casas (born 18 September 1971) is an American politician. He previously served as a member of the Georgia House of Representatives from the 107th District from Jan. 14, 2013, until Jan. 14, 2019. Casas represented the 103rd district from 2003 to 2013. Casas has sponsored 167 bills.

In 2018, Casas chose not to run for reelection. His successor, Shelly Hutchinson, took office on January 14, 2019.

References

Republican Party members of the Georgia House of Representatives
21st-century American politicians
Living people
People from Lilburn, Georgia
Hispanic and Latino American state legislators in Georgia (U.S. state)
American politicians of Cuban descent
American people of Spanish descent
1971 births